On 17 April 1945, the retreating German occupying forces inundated the polder of Wieringermeer, the Netherlands.

Preparations
In 1945 German forces occupying the Netherlands planned to destroy the Zuiderzee Works to cover their retreat. Military reasons for this are still unclear, but it may have been done to deny the Allies a landing area for airborne troops or gliders. In preparation for this flooding, the water level of the IJsselmeer was deliberately raised. Inundation had already been used on some Dutch polders but this strategic inundation was shallow and was done by stopping the drainage pumping or allowing water to flow backwards through the pumping stations to give a shallow flooding. The rapid and deep tactical inundation planned for the Wieringerpolder, done by the destruction of a dyke, was new. It was known that even an explosive breach would not be enough, and it would be the enlargement of the breach by the water itself which would cause the most damage.

In late February or early March 1945 Dutch workers started to undermine the dike around the polder under German command. The location is near the farm of Beetstra, in the dike with the IJsselmeer. Deep holes were dug in the dike both at the bottom and at the top of the dike. In these holes explosives would be put. The work was progressing slowly since none of the workers were motivated. In April, the work came to a complete stop.

On April 10, German officers came and inspected the work. New workers were sought and 25 to 50 people were taken from Schagen during a razzia to work on the digging. After a week, the holes were deep enough and explosives were installed.

Flooding 

On 17 April at 12.15 am, the explosives were detonated. The 7,000 people in the Wieringermeer and an estimated 1,000 to 2,000 refugees had to leave the polder. Within 48 hours, the entire polder was full with water, with an average depth of 

No one was killed as the polder slowly submerged again (the inhabitants had been warned), but the high water and a subsequent storm destroyed most of the infrastructure built in the previous decade. Buildings were not generally badly damaged by the flooding, but by the storms later.

As civilians left the flooding polder through the military checkpoints, the Resistance member , of Wieringermeer, was captured and then shot whilst trying to escape.

Reconstruction 

Reconstruction followed quickly after the German retreat; by the end of 1945, the polder was declared drained again. The floodwater was fresh water, so the land did not have to be desalinated again. Rebuilding of roads and bridges, houses and farms, was greatly facilitated by the experience of building them the first time. Some building materials were re-used: three million roof tiles were salvaged, many by removing them from the roofs of flooded buildings, also lightening the load on their weakened structures. 

The replacement dyke was also built to a simpler standard than the original: when first built, this had been a sea dyke protecting from the sea of the Zuider Zee. After the construction of the Afsluitdijk, this was now just the calmer water of the IJsselmeer.

See also 
 Inundation of Walcheren

References

Sources

J. J. Bosman and P. C. Bosman, De polder onder water, het verslag van de onderwaterzetting van de Wieringermeerpolder in 1945, Free Media, 1995

1945 in the Netherlands
Hollands Kroon
April 1945 events in Europe
Germany–Netherlands military relations